Gymnastics events have been staged at the Olympic Games since 1896, with women competing for the time at the 1928 Olympic Games. New Zealand sent female artistic gymnasts to the Olympic Games for the first time in 1964.

Gymnasts

See also 

 New Zealand at the 1964 Summer Olympics
 New Zealand at the 1972 Summer Olympics
 New Zealand at the 2000 Summer Olympics
 New Zealand at the 2016 Summer Olympics

References

New Zealand
gymnasts